Divorce in the United States is a legal process in which a judge or other authority dissolves the marriage existing between two persons. Divorce restores the persons to the status of being single and permits them to marry other individuals. In the United States, marriage and divorce fall under the jurisdiction of state governments, not the federal government.

Although such matters are usually ancillary or consequential to the dissolution of the marriage, divorce may also involve issues of spousal support, child custody, child support, distribution of property and division of debt.

History

19th century 
By the mid- to late 19th century, divorce rates in the United States increased, and Americans obtained more divorces annually than were granted in all of Europe. Previously, divorces in the US were mainly granted to the middle and upper-classes due to their cost, but the legal process became less expensive. Other proposed explanations include the popular acceptance of divorce as an alternative to marital unhappiness, decay of the belief in immortality and future punishment, discontent with the existing constitution of society, the habits of mobility created by better transportation, and the greater independence of women resulting in their enlarged legal rights and greater opportunities of self support. The divorce rate continued to increase in the early 20th century. In 1890, 3 couples per 1,000 were divorced, rising to 8 couples by 1920.

The Married Women's Property Acts in the United States were passed by the various states to give greater property rights to women and, in some cases, allowing them to sue for divorce. 

The women's rights movement debated the issue of whether to allow divorce, with Jane Swisshelm and Elizabeth Cady Stanton as early supporters, with Horace Greeley and Antoinette Brown Blackwell opposed. Unlike other issues, the movement was unable to achieve agreement. Stanton eventually came to see marriage law reform as more important than women's voting rights. Against Stanton, Lucy Stone sought to remove the advocacy of divorce from the women's platform to prevent the appearance of moral laxity. In government, Robert Dale Owen proposed laws granting greater freedom of divorce, which later came to fruition. The National Woman Suffrage Association, founded in 1869, included advocacy for divorce reform.

20th century 
Prior to the latter decades of the 20th century, divorce was considered to be against the public interest, and civil courts refused to grant a divorce except if one party to the marriage had betrayed the "innocent spouse." Thus, a spouse suing for divorce in most states had to show a "fault" such as abandonment, cruelty, incurable mental illness, or adultery. If an "innocent" husband and wife wished to separate, or if both were guilty, "neither would be allowed to escape the bonds of marriage." Divorce was barred if evidence revealed any hint of complicity between spouses to manufacture grounds for divorce, such as if the suing party engaged in procurement or connivance (contributing to the fault, such as by arranging for adultery), condonation (forgiving the fault either explicitly or by continuing to cohabit after knowing of it), or recrimination (the suing spouse also being guilty).

Divorce is governed by state rather than federal law, and a number of strategies were devised in several states to make divorce easier. By 1909, Reno, Nevada was "the divorce capital of the world." At that time, only six months in Nevada established state residency, and the Nevada courts, well aware of the contribution of divorce seekers to Nevada's hospitality industry, accepted the resident's uncorroborated assertion of grounds for divorce, usually "extreme cruelty.". In 1927, the Nevada Legislature, "in response to a perceived threat to Reno's divorce supremacy from France and Mexico and a divorce-trade war that had been going on since the end of World War I between Nevada, Idaho, and Arkansas," lowered the residency period to three months, and in 1931 the Legislature that voted for "wide-open gambling" lowered it to six weeks. Providing accommodations and other amenities for visitors, who could not leave Nevada during the six weeks, became a major Reno industry; greeters met the arriving trains, and there were a variety of divorce ranches. In 1942, the U.S. Supreme Court ruled in Williams v. North Carolina that other states had to recognize these divorces, under the "full faith and credit" clause of the U.S. Constitution.

By 1916, the U.S. led the world in number of divorces. In populous New York State, where adultery was the easiest grounds for divorce, attorneys would provide a divorce package of a prostitute and a photographer. Significant numbers of divorce seekers went to the cities on the Mexican side of the Mexico-U.S. border, or to Haiti, where they found welcoming attorneys, who sometimes advertised in the U.S. A memory of the practice is reflected in the song "Haitian Divorce," by Steely Dan.

By the 1960s, deception to bypass the fault system had become a widespread concern, if not actually a widespread practice, and a consensus grew for change. The National Association of Women Lawyers was instrumental in convincing the American Bar Association to create a Family Law section in many state courts, and pushed strongly for no-fault divorce law around 1960 (cf. Uniform Marriage and Divorce Act). In 1969, California became the first U.S. state to pass a no-fault divorce law.

The introduction of no-fault divorce led to a rise in divorce rates in the United States during the 1970s. The National Center for Health Statistics reports that from 1975 to 1988 in the US, in families with children present, wives file for divorce in approximately two-thirds of cases. In 1975, 71.4% of the cases were filed by women, and in 1988, 65% were filed by women.

Lenore Weitzman's 1985 book The Divorce Revolution, using data from California in 1977-78, reported that one year after divorce, the standard of living for women declined 73%, compared with an increase of 42% for men. Richard Peterson calls Weitzman's methodology into question, using the same data to calculate a 27% decrease for women and a 10% increase for men.

21st century 

The median length for a marriage in the US today is 11 years, with 90% of divorces settled out of court. Lower-income couples are currently more likely to get a divorce than higher-income couples. By the seventh wedding anniversary, the divorce rate among highly educated people who married in the early 2000s is 11%, while that for couples without college degrees is 17%.

In 2015, the Manhattan Supreme Court ruled that, in the case of a husband and wife who did not live together, where the husband had no fixed physical address where divorce papers could be served and where the husband had no written contact with his wife other than through Facebook, the wife could serve her husband divorce papers through a Facebook message, and she became the first to do so.

Law

Divorce in the U.S. is governed by state rather than federal law. The laws of the state(s) of residence at the time of divorce govern, not those of the location where the couple was married. All states recognize divorces granted by any other state, and all impose a minimum time of residence to file for a divorce, Nevada and Idaho currently being the shortest at six weeks.

All states allow no-fault divorce on grounds such as irreconcilable differences, irremediable breakdown, and loss of affection. Some states mandate a separation period before no-fault divorce. Mississippi, South Dakota and Tennessee are the only states that require mutual consent for no-fault divorce. The rest of the states permit unilateral no-fault divorce.

Since the mid-1990s, three states have enacted covenant marriage laws which give couples the option to make divorce more difficult, Louisiana, Arkansas, and Arizona. For example, couples who choose covenant marriage may be required to undergo counseling before a divorce can be granted, or to submit their conflicts to mediation. In states lacking such provisions, some couples sign contracts undertaking the same obligations.

A summary (or simple) divorce, available in some jurisdictions, is used when spouses meet certain eligibility requirements, or can agree on key issues beforehand. For example, to qualify for summary divorce in California, a couple must meet all of the following requirements:
 Have been married less than five years,
 Have no children together,
 Do not own any real property,
 Do not rent any real property other than current dwelling,
 Do not owe more than $6,000 for debts since date of marriage,
 Own less than $41,000 in community property (property acquired during marriage), not counting vehicles,
 Do not own more than $41,000 in separate property (property acquired before marriage), not counting vehicles,
 Agree to forgo spousal support,
 Have a signed agreement which divides property (including cars) and debts, and
 Meet residency requirement, if applicable.

Grounds for divorce

Though divorce laws vary between jurisdiction, there are two basic approaches to divorce: fault-based and no-fault. Fault grounds, when available, are sometimes still sought. This may be done where it reduces the waiting period otherwise required, or possibly in hopes of affecting decisions related to a divorce, such as child custody, child support, alimony, and so on. A court may still take into account the behavior of the parties when dividing property, debts, evaluating custody, and support. States vary in the admissibility of such evidence for those decisions.

No-fault divorce
Under a no-fault divorce system the dissolution of a marriage does not require an allegation or proof of fault of either party. Only three states (Mississippi, South Dakota and Tennessee) require mutual consent (in Tennessee it is needed only in certain circumstances) for a no-fault divorce to be granted. No-fault grounds for divorce include incompatibility, irreconcilable differences, and irremediable breakdown of the marriage.

At-fault divorce
Fault divorces used to be the only way to break a marriage, and people who had differences, but did not qualify as "at fault", only had the option to separate (and were prevented from legally remarrying).

However, there are ways (defenses) to prevent a fault divorce:
 Collusion
 Condonation
 Connivance
 Provocation
 Recrimination

A defense is expensive, and not usually practical as eventually most divorces are granted.

Comparative rectitude is a doctrine used to determine which spouse is more at fault when both spouses are guilty of breaches.

Jurisdiction
In the United States, the Federal Government does not have the authority to issue a divorce. The state has the only authority over issuing accepting a marriage, and issuing a divorce. This creates the question of which state can one get divorced in. All states have rules for jurisdiction, which is typically a time frame the person filing the divorce has lived in the state. Most states require the person filing for a divorce to be a physical resident of the state for six months. Some states require twelve months and some states, like Nevada, only require six weeks. Without proper jurisdiction a state cannot issue a divorce.

Property division and spousal support
States vary in their rules for division of assets in a divorce. The major difference is between states that use a community property system and states that do not. In community property states, community property belongs to the spouses equally. The following states use community property regimes: Arizona, California, Idaho, Louisiana, Nevada, New Mexico, Texas, Washington, and Wisconsin. Alaskan law gives couples the option to create community property by written agreement.

Most community property states start with the presumption that community assets will be divided equally, whereas "equitable distribution" states presume fairness may dictate more or less than half of the assets will be awarded to one spouse or the other. Commonly, assets acquired before marriage are considered individual, and assets acquired after, marital. Depending on the state, an equitable or equal division of assets is then sought.

In some states, educational degrees earned during the marriage may be considered marital property. In such states, a resolution of the divorce will often entail payment from the educated spouse to the other spouse a share of their expected future earnings that are due to a degree they earned during the marriage, and may require the expertise of labor economists or other statistical and financial experts.

Alimony, also known as 'maintenance' or 'spousal support' is still being granted in many cases, especially in longer term marriages. Alimony is more likely in cases where a spouse has remedial needs that must be met in order for the spouse to become fully employable, for example that one spouse gave up career opportunities or development in order to devote themselves to the family.

Child support and custody
In cases involving children, governments have a pressing interest in ensuring that disputes between parents do not spill over into the family courts. All states now require parents to file a parenting plan, or to decide on child custody and visitation either by reaching a written agreement or in a court hearing, when they legally separate or divorce.

The spouse given custody (or the spouse with the greater share of residence time in the case of joint custody), may receive assets to compensate their greater child-care expenses.

Alternatives to litigation

Collaborative divorce
Collaborative divorce (uncontested divorce) is becoming a popular method for divorcing couples to come to agreement on divorce issues. In a collaborative divorce, the parties negotiate an agreed resolution with the assistance of attorneys who are trained in the collaborative divorce process and in mediation, and often with the assistance of a neutral financial specialist and/or divorce coach. The parties are empowered to make their own decisions based on their own needs and interests, but with complete information and full professional support. Once the collaborative divorce starts, the lawyers are disqualified from representing the parties in a contested legal proceeding, should the collaborative law process end prematurely. Most attorneys who practice collaborative divorce claim that it can be substantially less expensive than other divorce methods (regular divorce or mediation). However, should the parties not reach any agreements, any documents or information exchanged during the collaborative process cannot later be used in further legal proceedings, as the collaborative process is confidential proceedings. Furthermore, there are no set enforceable time lines for completion of a divorce using collaborative divorce.

Mediated divorce
Divorce mediation is an alternative to traditional divorce litigation that attempts to help opposing spouses find common ground during the divorce process. In a divorce mediation session, a mediator facilitates the discussion between the spouses by assisting with communication and providing information and suggestions to help resolve differences. At the end of the mediation process, the separating parties will have typically developed a tailored divorce agreement that they can submit to the court. Parties to mediation do not need to retain attorneys. However, if the parties choose to retain attorneys their attorneys may be included in the mediation session. The mediator can provide both parties with information but will not offer advice to either. Divorce mediators may be attorneys, mental health professionals, or financial experts who have experience in divorce cases. Divorce mediation can be significantly less expensive than litigation. The adherence rate to mediated agreements is much higher than that of adherence to court orders.

Summary divorce

Many states allow for couples to file for a summary divorce based upon a jointly filed divorce petition. A summary divorce means the spouses have discussed the terms required by state law to issue a divorce and they have reached an mutual agreement. Almost every state allows for this type of "uncontested" divorce. An uncontested joint divorce petition will often save a divorcing couple both time and money.

Federal laws relating to divorce
Since the 1980s, federal legislation has been enacted affecting the rights and responsibilities of divorcing spouses. For example, federal welfare reform mandated the creation of child support guidelines in all 50 states in the 1980s. ERISA includes provisions for the division of qualified retirement accounts between divorcing spouses. The IRS established rules on ignoring alimony as a source of taxable income. Federal bankruptcy laws prohibit discharging in bankruptcy of alimony and child support obligations. COBRA allows a divorced spouse to obtain and maintain health insurance.

Qualified Domestic Relations Orders 

A "qualified domestic relations order" (QDRO) is an order that creates or recognizes the existence of an alternate payee's right to receive, or assigns to an alternate payee the right to receive, all or a portion of the benefits payable with respect to a participant under a retirement plan, and that includes certain information and meets certain other requirements.

A domestic relations order is a judgment, decree, or order (including the approval of a property settlement) that is made pursuant to state domestic relations law (including community property law) and that relates to the provision of child support, alimony payments, or marital property rights for the benefit of a spouse, former spouse, child, or other dependents of a participant.

A state authority, generally a court, must actually issue a judgment, order, or decree or otherwise formally approve a property settlement agreement before it can be a domestic relations order under ERISA. The mere fact that a property settlement is agreed to and signed by the parties will not, in and of itself, cause the agreement to be a domestic relations order.

Statistics

Initiation
According to a study published in the American Law and Economics Review, women file slightly more than two-thirds of divorce cases in the US.
There is some variation among states, and the numbers have also varied over time, with about 60% of filings by women in most of the 20th century, and over 70% by women in some states just after no-fault divorce was introduced, according to the paper.

Custody
In their 1997 study titled "Child Custody Policies and Divorce Rates in the US," Kuhn and Guidubaldi find it reasonable to conclude that women anticipate advantages to being single, rather than remaining married. In their detailed analysis of divorce rates, Kuhn and Guidubaldi conclude that acceptance of joint physical custody may reduce divorce. States whose family law policies, statutes, or judicial practice encourage joint custody have shown a greater decline in their divorce rates than those that favor sole custody.

Rates of divorce

"Rate of divorce" usually refers to the number of divorces that occur in the population during a given period. However it is also used in common parlance to refer to the likelihood of a given marriage ending in divorce (as opposed to the death of a spouse).

In 2002 (latest survey data as of 2012), 29% of first marriages among women aged 15–44 were disrupted (ended in separation, divorce or annulment) within 10 years. Beyond the 10-year window, population survey data is lacking, but forecasts and estimates provide some understanding. It is commonly claimed that half of all marriages in the United States eventually end in divorce, an estimate possibly based on the fact that in any given year, the number of marriages is about twice the number of divorces. Amato outlined in his study on divorce that in the late of 1990s, about 43% to 46% of marriages were predicted to end in dissolution. According to his research, only a small percentage of marriages end in permanent separation rather than divorce. Using 1995 data, National Survey of Family Growth forecast in 2002 a 43% chance that first marriages among women aged 15–44 would be disrupted within 15 years. More recently, having spoken with academics and National Survey of Family Growth representatives, PolitiFact.com estimated in 2012 that the lifelong probability of a marriage ending in divorce is 40%–50%.

Variables that may affect rates of divorce include:
 race/ethnicity
 importance of religion to the couple
 divorce in family of origin
 timing of the first birth of any children (before marriage, within 7 months, after 7 months, or never)
 if one spouse has generalized anxiety disorder

A 2008 study by Jenifer L. Bratter and Rosalind B. King conducted on behalf of the Education Resources Information Center examined whether crossing racial boundaries increased the risk of divorce. Using the 2002 National Survey of Family Growth (Cycle VI), the likelihood of divorce for interracial couples to that of same-race couples was compared. Comparisons across marriage cohorts revealed that, overall, interracial couples have higher rates of divorce, particularly for those that married during the late 1980s. The authors found that gender plays a significant role in interracial divorce dynamics: According to the adjusted models predicting divorce as of the 10th year of marriage, interracial marriages that are the most vulnerable involve White females and non-White males (with the exception of White females/Hispanic White males) relative to White/White couples. White wife/Black husband marriages are twice as likely to divorce by the 10th year of marriage compared to White/White couples. Conversely, White men/non-White women couples show either very little or no differences in divorce rates. Asian wife/White husband marriages show only 4% greater likelihood of divorce by the 10th year of marriage than White/White couples. In the case of Black wife/White husband marriages, divorce by the 10th year of marriage is 44% less likely than among White/White unions. Intermarriages that did not cross a racial barrier, which was the case for White/Hispanic White couples, showed statistically similar likelihoods of divorcing as White/White marriages.

A 2011 study at the University of Iowa found that a woman's loss of virginity before age 18 was correlated with a greater number of occurrences of divorce within the first 10 years of marriage.

A 2012 study cited by Pew Research Center found that an estimated 78% of women with bachelor's degrees, and 65% of men with bachelor's degrees who married between 2006-2010 can expect their marriages to last at least two decades. Women with a high school degree or less, on the other hand, face a meager 40% probability of their marriages surviving the same period.

Studies have shown that men who "earn high incomes have a decreased probability of getting a divorce". However, higher income makes a woman's chances of marriage less likely and it has no connection to possible divorces. In 1995, divorce rates have gone down due to education rates going up. This is because educated individuals make higher incomes in most cases, which result in less financial stress when couples set down to get married. Lower income couples value and respect marriage just as much as higher income couples, however lower income couples are more likely to get a divorce because of financial strains on their marriage. Having low income is not the only factor that can potentially lead to divorce. Religious beliefs, morals and compatibility all come into play when it comes to long term marital statuses.

Divorce rate by state
The following lists the number of divorces annually per 1,000 population in each state:

 Includes annulments. Includes divorce petitions filed or legal separations for some counties or States.
 Marriage data includes nonlicensed marriages registered.

See also

References

Further reading
 
 
 
 
 
 
 
 
 Morowitz, Harold J. "Hiding in the Hammond Report." Hospital Practice August 1975; 39.

History
 Blake, Nelson Manfred. The road to Reno: A history of divorce in the United States (Greenwood Press, 1977)
 Chused, Richard H. Private acts in public places: A social history of divorce in the formative era of American family law (U of Pennsylvania Press, 1994)
 Griswold, Robert L. "The Evolution of the Doctrine of Mental Cruelty in Victorian American Divorce, 1790-1900." Journal of Social History (1986): 127–148. in JSTOR
 Griswold, Robert L. Family and Divorce in California, 1850-1890: Victorian Illusions and Everyday Realities (1982).
 May, Elaine Tyler. "The Pressure to Provide: Class, Consumerism, and Divorce in Urban America, 1880-1920." Journal of Social History (1978): 180–193. in JSTOR
 May, Elaine Tyler. Great expectations: Marriage and divorce in post-Victorian America (1980)
 Riley, Glenda. Divorce: an American tradition (U of Nebraska Press, 1991) online
 Schweninger, Loren. Families in Crisis in the Old South: Divorce, Slavery, and the Law. Chapel Hill, NC: University of North Carolina Press, 2012. online

External links
 
 

 
Family law in the United States